The Diocesan Shrine and Parish of Our Lady of Mercy is a Roman Catholic church under the Diocese of Novaliches. It is the oldest parish in the diocese, established in 1856 by the Augustinian missionaries from Spain.

This church was originally under the Archdiocese of Manila when it was established on September 24, 1856, by then Manila Archbishop José Julián de Aranguren. Since then, this parish had become an established landmark in the Novaliches area, witnessing the historical development of this district.

It is located along Quirino Highway, Barangay Sta. Monica, Novaliches, Quezon City. The current rector and parish priest is Rev. Fr. Jose Peregrino V. Tomas. The annual feast day of the church is September 24.

History

Beginnings as a parish 
The establishment and history of Novaliches are linked to this church. After the Novaliches district was established in 1854, the first church was built two years later by the Augustinians under the decree of José Julián de Aranguren, Archbishop of Manila. On September 24, 1856, the church was established and was initially called the Chapel of Corpus Christi, dedicated to the Blessed Sacrament. The chapel was elevated to the status of a Parroquia (parish church) and Fray André Martín, OSA was appointed as the first parish priest. It is said that he brought an image of Our Lady of Mercy holding the Child Jesus, similar to the iconography of the image of Nuestra Señora de la Consolación y Correa (Our Lady of Consolation and the Cincture) enshrined in San Agustín Church in Intramuros, Manila, and enshrined the said image in the parish. 

The devotion to Our Lady of Mercy developed over the years until the Philippine Revolution of 1896 against the Spanish Empire, when the original image disappeared. The church was burnt, and the assigned Augustinian priests returned to Spain. The sole relic of the old church saved from the Revolution is a golden chalice encrusted with amethysts. This was donated by Manuel Pavía y Lacy, First Marquis de Novaliches (1814-1896), who served as the Governor-General of the Philippines from 1852 to 1854. The parcel of land where the church once stood was donated to the Archdiocese of Manila. In 1899, Novaliches was annexed to Caloocan. For about thirty years, nothing was heard about the Parroquia de Novaliches. 

In 1928, the parish was restored with the appointment of a diocesan parish priest, Rev. Fr. Victor Raymundo. The parish was renamed Our Lady of Ransom Parish, then later reverted to Our Lady of Mercy Parish. Under Rev. Fr. Segundo Alto in the 1950s, an image of Our Lady of Mercy, without the Child Jesus, emerged. According to oral history, this image was first seen by Novaleños in the 1930s; it was actually commissioned by Macaria Sarmiento-Mendoza in the early 20th century and was identified to have been carved by Graciano Nepomuceno. This image was considered to be "La Verdadera", being the oldest extant icon of Our Lady of Mercy in Novaliches, and was then enshrined at the high altar.

During the 1980s, the growing number of faithful residing in Novaliches prompted Rev. Msgr. Manuel Sebastián to renovate and expand the church. He also thought of commissioning a bigger replica of La Verdadera since it was too small. A de vestir ("in vestments") replica carved by Rufino Rivera was completed in 1985 and enshrined in its own marble side altar. In the 1990s, the image was sacrilegiously toppled by an unknown individual, damaging it to the point it needed repairs. The image once again underwent restoration for a diocesan tour around Novaliches to propagate the devotion to Our Lady of Mercy. This second image is currently brought out for processions.

Renovation and recognitions 
In preparation for the elevation of the church as a diocesan shrine, another major renovation began in 2001 through the initiative of Rev. Fr. Miguelito Lagrimas and the concerted efforts of the Novaleños and devotees of Our Lady of Mercy. The Susano family commissioned Wilfredo Layug to make a new altar with a new image of Our Lady of Mercy that is now seen today. The present image is bigger than life-size and this time, it deviated to the iconography of La Verdadera and the procession image. The new altar was consecrated on March 4, 2007.

Due to the enduring devotion to Nuestra Señora de la Merced in Novaliches and the historical importance of her sacred place, on September 15, 2008, the parish church was elevated as a diocesan shrine by Most Rev. Antonio R. Tobias, DD. On its first anniversary as a diocesan shrine, the church was presented with an 18-bell carillon, a token of gratitude from the devotees of Our Lady of Mercy. The 18-carillon bells were blessed on September 8, 2009, and installed in the church’s belfry. 

Another historical milestone was granted to the diocesan shrine on January 1, 2021. Most Rev. Roberto O. Gaa, DD has declared Our Lady of Mercy as the second patroness of the diocese, and officially took the name "Ina ng Novaliches" (Mother of Novaliches). Tracing back the history, this church was the only parish in Novaliches, and from it sprung the different churches around the Novaliches district, including North Caloocan.

On April 09, 2021, Most Rev. Roberto O. Gaa, DD opened the Holy Door (Jubillee Door) of the shrine in celebration of the 500 years of Christianity in the Philippines. The shrine is one of the fourteen jubilee churches in the Diocese of Novaliches, in line with the said celebration.

Then on June 6, 2021, the Diocesan Shrine and Parish of Our Lady of Mercy of Novaliches formally obtained its Spiritual Bond of Affinity to Papal Basilica of Santa Maria Maggiore in Rome. The declaration was led by Most Rev. Charles John Brown, DD, Apostolic Nuncio to the Philippines, during a Corpus Christi Sunday Mass. This declaration would mean that habitual plenary indulgence and graces shall be granted among the faithful, with the same conditions. 

And on September 24, 2021, its 165th anniversary as a parish, the Pontifical and Canonical Coronation Ceremony of Our Lady of Novaliches was held. The La Verdadera image received its pontifical crown and halo in a mass presided by Most Rev. Charles John Brown, DD, and concelebrated by Most Rev. Roberto O. Gaa, DD, Most Rev. Teodoro C. Bacani, Jr., DD, and Most Rev. Antonio R. Tobias, DD.

Images of the Our Lady of Mercy of Novaliches 

There are three main images of Nuestra Señora de la Merced de Novaliches venerated in her shrine: the centuries-old original image, the processional de vestir image, and the now recognizable altar image.

"La Verdadera" 
The original de tallado image presents the Blessed Virgin Mary as Our Lady of Mercy standing on a cloud with putti (little angels), both hands are raised and extended and previously holding a chain or the White Mercedarian Scapular, has long and wavy hair covered with a dainty veil wears a crown and the diagnostic doce estrellas. The original crown and halo were replaced with a 14-karat gold crown decorated with white pearls and diamonds and a gold-plated halo made of silver with pearls, diamonds and precious stones after the Pontifical and Canonical Coronation Ceremony. The head of the Virgin is looking sideway which is quite interesting for this image. The Virgin wears a wig now, and the Mercedarian habit - the white habit and white scapular and a blue cape. The image is now securely enshrined on the side altar of the church after it received its pontifical and canonical crown and halo.

"De Vestir" 
The second image is the de vestir processional image where it also shares the same elements of the original image of Nuestra Señora de la Merced de Novaliches from the vestments (richly embroidered white habit, white scapular, and blue cape), hands that are extended and raised holding the White Mercedarian Scapular and chain, wears a dainty veil and also wears a crown and the diagnostic doce estrellas. For this image, the Virgin faces the beholder with a sweet smile and wears a wig.

"Retablo" 
The third and probably the currently recognized image of the shrine is the altar image. The current altar image is a more than life-size de tallado image that deviates from the traditional iconography of the first two images of the Shrine. For this image, the Virgin wears the Mercedarian habit from the white robe, cape and scapular hold the White Mercedarian Scapular on her right and a scepter on the left. The Virgin looks sideways towards the left and has very modern Spanish features. The Virgin's hair was long and wavy topped with a crown and the diagnostic doce estrellas. Most recently a smaller replica of the image was commissioned that would serve as a pilgrim image that would visit the communities within the vicinity of the shrine.

Recent rectors and parish priests 
This list presents the recent rector and parish priests of the church since it was elevated into a diocesan shrine.

 Rev. Fr. Montecarlo M. Viloria (as rector from September 2008 - June 2013)
 Rev. Fr. Antonio E. Labiao, Jr. (from June 2013 - June 2019)
 Rev. Fr. Jose Peregrino V. Tomas (from June 2019 - present)

References 

 Roman Catholic churches in Quezon City